Marcos Guillermo Díaz (born 5 February 1986) is an Argentine professional footballer who plays as a goalkeeper for Portuguese club Santa Clara.

Career
Díaz joined Colón at the age of nine, being promoted to the first-team in 2009. He made his professional debut during 2009–10 in a 4–1 victory over Arsenal de Sarandí on 8 October 2009. Eleven further appearances followed throughout his first three seasons with Colón. In July 2012, Díaz departed on loan to sign for Primera B Nacional side Gimnasia y Esgrima. He made eight appearances as the club ended the season in tenth. Ahead of 2013–14, Díaz joined fellow Primera B Nacional team Huracán on loan. He went on to feature twenty times and was subsequently signed permanently in June 2014.

Between 2013 and 2014, Díaz won the Copa Argentina and Supercopa Argentina with Huracán. In his first full season, 2014, Huracán won promotion to the Primera División. In 2015, Díaz played forty-three matches, with sixteen coming in continental competition including ten in the 2015 Copa Sudamericana where Huracán reached the final but lost on penalties to Santa Fe. Díaz left on 31 December 2018, following the expiration of his contract; despite appearing sixteen times during 2018–19. Boca Juniors announced the signing of Díaz on 11 January 2019. On late 2020, Díaz joined Talleres.

In January 2023, Díaz signed a contract with Santa Clara in Portugal until June 2024.

Career statistics
.

Honours
Huracán
Copa Argentina: 2013–14
Supercopa Argentina: 2014

Boca Juniors
Primera División: 2019–20
Supercopa Argentina: 2018

References

1986 births
Footballers from Santa Fe, Argentina
Living people
Argentine footballers
Association football goalkeepers
Club Atlético Colón footballers
Gimnasia y Esgrima de Jujuy footballers
Club Atlético Huracán footballers
Boca Juniors footballers
Talleres de Córdoba footballers
C.D. Santa Clara players
Argentine Primera División players
Primera Nacional players
Argentine expatriate footballers
Expatriate footballers in Portugal
Argentine expatriate sportspeople in Portugal